Plan Dalet (Tokhnit dalet) was a plan worked out by the Haganah in Mandatory Palestine in March 1948. Its name was from the letter Dalet (ד), the fourth letter of the Hebrew alphabet.

Its purpose is much debated. The plan, requested by David Ben-Gurion who became Israel's first prime minister, was a set of guidelines to take control of Mandatory Palestine, declare a Jewish state, and defend its borders and people, including the Jewish population outside of the borders, "before, and in anticipation of" the invasion by regular Arab armies. According to the Israeli Yehoshafat Harkabi, Plan Dalet called for the conquest of Arab towns and villages inside and along the borders of the area allocated to the proposed Jewish State in the UN Partition Plan. In case of resistance, the population of conquered villages was to be expelled outside the borders of the Jewish state. If no resistance was met, the residents could stay put, under military rule.

The intent of Plan Dalet is subject to much controversy, with historians on one side asserting that it was entirely defensive, while other historians assert that the plan aimed at the expulsion, sometimes called an ethnic cleansing, on the grounds that this was an integral part of a planned strategy.

Background
In the summer of 1937, according to the official history of the Haganah, the commander of their forces in the Tel Aviv area, Elimelech Slikowitz ("Avnir") received an order from Ben-Gurion who,  anticipating an eventual British withdrawal from the country after the Peel Report, asking Slikowitz to prepare a plan for the military conquest of the whole of Palestine. According to the historians Walid Khalidi and Ahmad H. Sa'di, it was this Avnir Plan which provided a blueprint, refined in subsequent adjustments (A,B.C) before it emerged in its final form as Plan Dalet over a decade later.

From 1945 onwards, the Haganah designed  four general military plans, the implementation of the final version of which eventually lead to the creation of Israel and the dispossession of the Palestinians:
 Plan Aleph (Plan A), drawn up in February 1945 to complement the political aim of a unilateral declaration of independence. It was designed to suppress Palestinian Arab resistance to the Zionist take-over of parts of Palestine.
 Plan Bet (Plan B), produced in September 1945, emerged in May 1947 and designed to replace Plan Aleph in the context of new developments such as Britain's submission of the problem of Palestine to the United Nations and growing opposition from surrounding Arab states to the Zionist partition plan.
 Plan Gimel (Plan C), also known as "May Plan", produced in May 1946, emerged in November/December 1947, in the wake of the UN Partition Plan. It was designed to enhance Zionist military and police mobilisation and enable action as needed.
 Plan Dalet (Plan D), of March 1948, is the most noteworthy. Guided by a series of specific operational plans, the broad outlines of which were considered as early as 1944, Plan Dalet was drawn up to expand Jewish-held areas beyond those allocated to the proposed Jewish State in the UN Partition Plan. Its overall objective was to seize as much territory as possible in advance of the termination of the British Mandate—when the Zionist leaders planned to declare their state.

On November 29, 1947, the UN voted to approve the Partition Plan for Palestine for ending the British Mandate and recommending the establishment of an Arab state and a Jewish state. In the immediate aftermath of the United Nations' approval of the Partition plan, the Jewish community expressed joy, while the Arab community expressed discontent. On the day after the vote, a spate of Arab attacks left at least eight Jews dead, one in Tel Aviv by sniper fire, and seven in ambushes on civilian buses that were claimed to be retaliations for a Lehi raid ten days earlier. Shooting, stoning, and rioting continued apace in the following days. Fighting began almost as soon as the plan was approved, beginning with the Arab Jerusalem Riots of 1947. Soon after, violence broke out and became more and more prevalent. Murders, reprisals, and counter-reprisals came fast on each other's heels, resulting in dozens of victims killed on both sides in the process. The sanguinary impasse persisted as no force intervened to put a stop to the escalating cycles of violence.

From January onward, operations became increasingly militarized, with the intervention of a number of regiments of the Arab Liberation Army (consisting of volunteers from Arab countries) inside Palestine, each active in a variety of distinct sectors around the different coastal towns. They consolidated their presence in Galilee and Samaria. Abd al-Qadir al-Husayni came from Egypt with several hundred men of the Army of the Holy War. Having recruited a few thousand volunteers, al-Husayni organised the blockade of the 100,000 Jewish residents of Jerusalem. To counter this, the Yishuv authorities tried to supply the Jews of the city with food by using convoys of up to 100 armoured vehicles, but the operation became more and more impractical as the number of casualties in the relief convoys surged. By March, Al-Hussayni's tactic, sometimes called "The War of the Roads", had paid off. Almost all of Haganah's armoured vehicles had been destroyed, the blockade was in full operation, and the Haganah had lost more than 100 troops. According to Benny Morris, the situation for those who dwelt in the Jewish settlements in the highly isolated Negev and North of Galilee was equally critical. According to Ilan Pappé, in early March, the Yishuv's security leadership did not seem to regard the overall situation as particularly troubling, but instead was busy finalising a master plan.

This situation caused the United States to withdraw their support for the Partition plan, thus encouraging the Arab League to believe that the Palestinians, reinforced by the Arab Liberation Army, could put an end to partition. The British, meanwhile, decided on the 7 February 1948, to support the annexation of the Arab part of Palestine by Transjordan.

Plan
In 1947, David Ben-Gurion reorganised Haganah and made conscription obligatory. Every Jewish man and woman in the country had to receive military training. Military equipment was procured from stockpiles from the Second World War and from Czechoslovakia and was brought in Operation Balak. There is some disagreement among historians about the precise authors of Plan Dalet. According to some, it was the result of the analysis of Yigael Yadin, at that time the temporary head of the Haganah, after Ben-Gurion invested him with the responsibility to come up with a plan in preparation for the announced intervention of the Arab states. According to Ilan Pappé the plan was conceived by the "consultancy", a group of about a dozen military and security figures and specialists on Arab affairs, under the guidance of Ben-Gurion. It was finalised and sent to Haganah units in early March 1948. The plan consisted of a general part and operational orders for the brigades, which specified which villages should be targeted and other specific missions. The general section of the plan was also sent to the Yishuv's political leaders.

Purpose
In this plan, the Haganah also started the transformation from an underground organization into a regular army. The reorganization included the formation of brigades and front commands. The stated goals included in addition to the reorganization, gaining control of the areas of the planned Jewish state as well as areas of Jewish settlements outside its borders. The control would be attained by fortifying strongholds in the surrounding areas and roads, conquering Arab villages close to Jewish settlements and occupying British bases and police stations (from which the British were withdrawing).

The introduction of the plan states:
a) The objective of this plan is to gain control of the areas of the Hebrew state and defend its borders. It also aims at gaining control of the areas of Jewish settlements and concentrations which are located outside the borders (of the Hebrew state) against regular, semi-regular, and small forces operating from bases outside or inside the state.

Later on, the plan states:
f) Generally, the aim of this plan is not an operation of occupation outside the borders of the Hebrew state. However, concerning enemy bases lying directly close to the borders which may be used as springboards for infiltration into the territory of the state, these must be temporarily occupied and searched for hostiles according to the above guidelines, and they must then be incorporated into our defensive system until operations cease.

According to David Tal,

The strategy called for the fortification and stabilization of a continuous Jewish-controlled line within the areas of the designated Jewish State and along its putative borders, and for the harassment of, and interference with, the Arab forces as they moved in. The success of this strategy depended on three elements: {'}cleansing{'} the area along the Jewish States's borders of an Arab presence; fortifying the Jewish settlements along the line of advance of the Arab column; and {'}hit-and-run{'} raids against the Arab troops as they advanced.

Details
The plan section 3, under (b) Consolidation of Defense Systems and Fortifications calls for the occupation of police stations, the control of government installations, and the protection of secondary transportation arteries. Part 4 under this heading includes the following controversial paragraphs:

Mounting operations against enemy population centers located inside or near our defensive system in order to prevent them from being used as bases by an active armed force. These operations can be divided into the following categories:
Destruction of villages (setting fire to, blowing up, and planting mines in the debris), especially those population centers which are difficult to control continuously.
Mounting search and control operations according to the following guidelines: encirclement of the village and conducting a search inside it. In the event of resistance, the armed force must be destroyed and the population must be expelled outside the borders of the state.
The villages which are emptied in the manner described above must be included in the fixed defensive system and must be fortified as necessary.
In the absence of resistance, garrison troops will enter the village and take up positions in it or in locations which enable complete tactical control. The officer in command of the unit will confiscate all weapons, wireless devices, and motor vehicles in the village. In addition, he will detain all politically suspect individuals. After consultation with the [Jewish] political authorities, bodies will be appointed consisting of people from the village to administer the internal affairs of the village. In every region, a [Jewish] person will be appointed to be responsible for arranging the political and administrative affairs of all [Arab] villages and population centers which are occupied within that region.

The paragraph (g) Counterattacks Inside and Outside the Borders of the State inter alia states:
Counterattacks will generally proceed as follows: a force the size of a battalion, on average, will carry out a deep infiltration and will launch concentrated attacks against population centers and enemy bases with the aim of destroying them along with the enemy force positioned there.

Implementation
Plan Dalet was implemented from the start of April onward. This marked the beginning of the second stage of the war in which, according to Benny Morris, the Haganah passed from the defensive to the offensive.

Execution

The first operation, named Nachshon, consisted of lifting the blockade on Jerusalem. 1500 men from Haganah's Givati brigade and Palmach's Harel brigade conducted sorties to free up the route to the city between 5 April and 20 April.
The operation was successful, and enough foodstuffs to last 2 months were trucked into Jerusalem for distribution to the Jewish population. However, Plan Dalet had not yet begun during Operation Nachshon.

The success of the operation was assisted by the death of Al-Hussayni in combat. During this time, and independently of Haganah or the framework of Plan Dalet, irregular troops from Irgun and Lehi formations massacred a number of Arabs at Deir Yassin, an event that, though publicly deplored and criticized by the principal Jewish authorities, had a deep impact on the morale of the Palestinian population.

At the same time, April 4–14, the first large-scale operation of the Arab Liberation Army ended in a debacle, having been roundly defeated at Mishmar HaEmek, coinciding with the loss of their Druze allies through defection.

Within the framework of the establishment of Jewish territorial continuity foreseen by Plan Dalet, the forces of Haganah, Palmach, and Irgun intended to conquer mixed zones.  Tiberias, Haifa, Safed, Beisan, Jaffa,  and Acre fell. However, Plan Dalet had not yet begun at that time. Palestinian society was shaken, resulting in the flight of more than 250,000 Palestinians.

The British had, at that time, essentially withdrawn their troops. The situation moved the leaders of the neighboring Arab states to intervene, but their preparations had not finalised, and they could not assemble sufficient forces to turn the tide of the war. Many Palestinian hopes lay with the Arab Legion of Transjordan's monarch, King Abdullah I, but he had no intention of creating a Palestinian-run state, since he hoped to annex as much of the territory of the British Mandate of Palestine as he could.

In preparation for the offensive, Haganah successfully launched Operations Yiftah and Ben-'Ami to secure the Jewish settlements of Galilee and Operation Kilshon, which created a united front around Jerusalem.

Operations

Outcome

According to Benny Morris, the Plan's execution lasted about eight weeks
, beginning April 2. In these weeks, the Yishuv's position changed dramatically. Many Arab leaders left the country and local leadership collapsed. On the Jewish side, the number of those killed during the execution of the plan was 1,253, of which 500 were civilians. On the Arab side, Jewish counter-attacks and offensives precipitated a mass exodus of 250,000–300,000 people. According to Benny Morris, this "massive demographic upheaval ... propelled the Arab states closer to an invasion about which they were largely unenthusiastic".

Controversy about intent
The intent of Plan Dalet is subject to much controversy, with historians on the one extreme asserting that it was entirely defensive, and historians on the other extreme asserting that the plan aimed at maximum conquest and expulsion.
According to the French historian Henry Laurens, the importance of the military dimension of plan Dalet becomes clear by comparing the operations of the Jordanian and the Egyptian armies. The ethnical homogeneity of the coastal area, obtained by the expulsions of the Palestinians eased the halt of the Egyptian advance, while Jewish Jerusalem, located in an Arab population area, was encircled by Jordanian forces.

According to The Oxford Handbook of Genocide Studies, whilst there may be controversy whether Plan Dalet was a centralized plan of ethnic cleansing, it could as well be a case of Haganah forces discovering that they could carry out ethnic cleansing at the local and regional level, as their offensive drove out large numbers of Arabs.

Historians asserting that the plan aimed at maximum conquest and expulsion
Walid Khalidi, General Secretary of the Institute for Palestine Studies, offered this interpretation in an address to the American Committee on Jerusalem:
As is witnessed by the Haganah's Plan Dalet, the Jewish leadership was determined to link the envisaged Jewish state with the Jerusalem corpus separatum. But the corpus separatum lay deep in Arab territory, in the middle of the envisaged Palestinian state, so this linking up could only be done militarily.
Khalidi calls Plan Dalet a "Master Plan for the Conquest of Palestine". He points to the Zionist ideas of transfer and of a Jewish state in all of Palestine, and to the offensive character of the military operations of the Zionists as the main proof of his interpretation.
In his book The Ethnic Cleansing of Palestine Israeli historian Ilan Pappé asserts that Plan Dalet was a "blueprint for ethnic cleansing":
... this ... blueprint spelled it out clearly and unambiguously: the Palestinians had to go ... The aim of the plan was in fact the destruction of both rural and urban areas of Palestine.

Pappé distinguishes between the general section of Plan Dalet and the operational orders given to the troops. According to Pappé the general section of the plan, which was distributed to politicians, was misguiding as to the real intentions of the Haganah. The real plan was handed down to the brigade commanders "not as vague guidelines, but as clear-cut operational orders for action". Along with the general section, "each brigade commander received a list of the villages or neighborhoods that had to be occupied, destroyed, and their inhabitants expelled".

Historians asserting that the plan was defensive
In his book on the birth of the Palestinian refugee problem Israeli historian Benny Morris discusses the relevance of the idea of "population transfer" in Zionist thinking. Morris concludes that there was Zionist support for transfer "in the 1930s and early 1940s", and that while this "transfer thinking" had conditioned the Yishuv's hearts and minds to accept it as natural and inevitable when it happened, it "was not tantamount to pre-planning, and did not issue in the production of a policy or master plan of expulsion; the Yishuv and its military forces did not enter the 1948 War, which was initiated by the Arab side, with a policy or plan for expulsion".

On the intent of Plan Dalet Morris writes:
The essence of the plan was the clearing of hostile and potentially hostile forces out of the interior of the territory of the prospective Jewish State, establishing territorial continuity between the major concentrations of Jewish population and securing the future State's borders before, and in anticipation of, the invasion [by Arab states]. The Haganah regarded almost all the villages as actively or potentially hostile.

The plan was neither understood nor used by the senior field officers as a blanket instruction for the expulsion of 'the Arabs'. But, in providing for the expulsion or destruction of villages that had resisted or might threaten the Yishuv, it constituted a strategic-doctrinal and carte blanche for expulsions by front, brigade, district and battalion commanders (who in each case argued military necessity) and it gave commanders, post facto, formal, persuasive cover for their actions. However, during April–June, relatively few commanders faced the moral dilemma of having to carry out the expulsion clauses. Townspeople and villagers usually left their homes before or during battle, and Haganah rarely had to decide about, or issue, expulsion orders....".
According to Israeli historian Yoav Gelber, Plan Dalet was a defensive plan:
Although it provided for counter-attacks, Plan Dalet was a defensive scheme and its goals were (1) protection of the borders of the upcoming Jewish state according to the partition line; (2) securing its territorial continuity in the face of invasion attempts; (3) safeguarding freedom of movement on the roads and (4) enabling continuation of essential daily routines.
Gelber rejects what he calls the "Palestinian-invented" version of Plan Dalet. Gelber says: "The text clarified unequivocally that expulsion concerned only those villages that would fight against the Hagana and resist occupation, and not all Arab hamlets".
Military historian David Tal writes, "the plan did provide the conditions for the destruction of Palestinian villages and the deportation of the dwellers; this was not the reason for the plan's composition", and that "its aim was to ensure full control over the territory assigned to the Jews by the partition resolution, thus placing the Haganah in the best possible strategic position to face an Arab invasion".

See also

References

Quotes

Citations

Sources

 Walid  Khalidi - All That Remains. 
 Shabtai Teveth, Ben-Gurion and the Palestinian Arabs: From Peace to War, Oxford University Press, Oxford, 1985
 
 Benny Morris, The Birth of the Palestinian Refugee Problem Revisited, Cambridge University Press, 2004
 Benny Morris, 1948: A history of the first Arab–Israeli war. Yale University Press, 2008
 Yoav Gelber, Palestine 1948: War, Escape And The Emergence Of The Palestinian Refugee problem, 2nd ed., Brighton, Sussex Academic Press, 2006
 David Tal, War in Palestine 1948: strategy and diplomacy, Routledge, London, 2004
 J. C. Bosma, "Plan Dalet in the context of the contradictions of Zionism", Holy Land Studies 9 (2), 2010, p. 209-227
 Rosemarie M. Esber, Under The Cover of War. The Zionist Expulsion of the Palestinians, Arabicus, 2009, p. 43 ; pp. 179–182.

External links 
 MidEast Web Historical Documents - Plan D, March 10, 1948
 Video of an interview with Ilan Pappé on the Ethnic Cleansing of Palestine
A Documentary film that tells the story of the human toll that Plan Dalet claimed the village of Eilabun.

1947–1948 civil war in Mandatory Palestine
Haganah
1948 Palestinian exodus